Giovanni Menchi (born 25 October 1975) is an Italian equestrian. He competed in two events at the 2004 Summer Olympics.

References

External links
 

1975 births
Living people
Italian male equestrians
Olympic equestrians of Italy
Equestrians at the 2004 Summer Olympics
Sportspeople from Florence